Stuart Jay Freedman (January 13, 1944 – November 10, 2012) was an American physicist, known for his work on a Bell test experiment with John Clauser at the University of California, Berkeley as well as for his contributions to nuclear and particle physics, particularly weak interaction physics. He was a graduate of Berkeley, receiving a Bachelor of Science in 1965 and his PhD in physics in 1972 under Eugene Commins. While at Berkeley, he worked with fellow graduate student Steven Chu. He was also recipient of 2007 Tom W. Bonner Prize in Nuclear Physics.

He held positions at Princeton University, Stanford University, Argonne National Laboratory, the University of Chicago, and the Lawrence Berkeley Laboratory.

In memory of his contributions, the American Physical Society (APS) established an award in his name, the Stuart Jay Freedman Award in Experimental Nuclear Physics. He was elected a Fellow of the APS in 1984 for "important studies of weak interactions phenomena in nuclei."

References

External links 
 R. G Hamish Robertson, "Stuart Jay Freedman", Biographical Memoirs of the National Academy of Sciences (2014)

1944 births
2012 deaths
21st-century  American physicists
20th-century American physicists
Fellows of the American Physical Society
Members of the United States National Academy of Sciences